The Rabid Whole (also known by the acronym TRW) is a Canadian music group from Regina, Saskatchewan, that plays a mixture of rock, industrial, electronica, and alternative music.

On April 21, 2009 via Synthetic Sounds the band released their full-length debut album entitled Autraumaton across Canada. In November 2009, Autraumaton was released on Danse Macabre Records in Germany, for distribution in Europe, with 3 bonus remixes by 16 Volt, Mind.In.A.Box, and XP8. In February 2011 those 3 remixes were re-released for the North American market along with several other remixed tracks from Autraumaton, on the remix album Autraumaton Remixed. The band has performed with leading Canadian acts Econoline Crush, Ayria and Left Spine Down in support of their debut album in Canada and has performed with international acts such as Hinder, The Birthday Massacre, Hanzel Und Gretyl, Apoptygma Berzerk, 16Volt and Chemlab.

Members
Andreas Weiss - songwriting, vocals, guitar, keyboards / programming
Chalsey Noelle - keyboards, backing vocals
George Radutu - guitar
Oscar Anesetti - bass
Matt O'Rourke - drums

Past members
 Sheenah Ko - keyboards, backing vocals (2009-2012)
 James McKenzie - drums (2009)
 Alex Ready- drums (2009)
 JJ Tartaglia - drums (2013)

Discography
 Autraumaton (2009)
 Autraumaton Remixed (2011)
 Refuge (2012)
 Problems (EP, 2014)

References

External links 
The Rabid Whole
Official Facebook page

Canadian industrial music groups
Canadian electronic music groups
Canadian alternative rock groups
Musical groups established in 2007
Musical groups from Regina, Saskatchewan
2007 establishments in Saskatchewan